Nezami (also Romanized as Nez̧āmī; also known as Nez̧āmīn) is a village in Lasgerd Rural District, in the Central District of Sorkheh County, Semnan Province, Iran. At the 2006 census, its population was 27, in 6 families.

References 

Populated places in Sorkheh County